Walter of Montbéliard (died in 1212) (Gauthier I de Montfaucon) was regent of the Kingdom of Cyprus from 1205 to 1210, and Constable of Jerusalem from around 1204 to his death.

Early life 

He was the second son of Amadeus, Count of Montbéliard. He took the cross after the Fourth Crusade was announced in 1199. Two years later he joined his cousin, Walter III, Count of Brienne, who had laid claim to the Principality of Taranto and other domains in the Kingdom of Sicily and invaded Southern Italy. Before long, Walter left Southern Italy for the Holy Land.

Cyprus 

Aimery, King of Cyprus and Jerusalem, gave his eldest daughter, Burgundia, in marriage to Walter and also made him constable of Jerusalem. Aimery died on 1 April 1205 and was succeeded in Cyprus by his ten-year-old son, Hugh I. The High Court elected Walter both guardian of the minor king and regent, violating the custom that prescribed that the two offices were to be separated.

The Seljuks laid siege to Satalia (now Antalya in Turkey), an important port in Asia Minor, in 1207. Satalia was held by an Italian adventurer, Aldobrandino. On Aldobrandino's demand, Walter intervened in the conflict and forced the Seljuks to lift the siege. However, the Greek citizens turned against him and expelled the Cypriot troops from the town with Seljuk assistance.

He arranged the marriage of Hugh I with Alice of Champagne, who was the eldest daughter of Henry, King of Jerusalem and Count of Champagne.

Hugh I reached the age of majority in 1210. Walter surrendered his regency, but refused to render an account of his administration of the royal treasury. Instead, he and his family left Cyprus and settled in the Kingdom of Jerusalem. Before long, Walter accused Hugh I of confiscating his estates in Cyprus and expelling him from the island without a fair judgement. In his letter to Pope Innocent III, Walter also referred to an uncanonical election of a bishop in Cyprus, which brought Hugh I into a conflict with the Holy See.

Holy Land 

He married Bourgogne, daughter of King Aimery of Cyprus in 1204, they had:
 Odo of Montbéliard, married Eschive de Tiberias
 Eschiva married first to Gerard of Montagu, next to Balian of Beirut.

References

Sources 

 
 

 
 

House of Montfaucon
People of the Kingdom of Cyprus
Christians of the Fourth Crusade